Maavaidhoo (Dhivehi: މާވައިދޫ) is one of the inhabited islands of Haa Dhaalu Atoll administrative division and geographically part of Thiladhummathi Atoll in the north of the Maldives.

The island was severely damaged by the great cyclone of 1821 that hit the northern atolls of the Maldives.

Islands of the Maldives